Kim Chung (born 21 November 1963) is a North Korean former footballer. He represented North Korea on at least five occasions in 1990.

Career statistics

International

References

1963 births
Living people
North Korean footballers
North Korea international footballers
Association football goalkeepers
Footballers at the 1990 Asian Games
Medalists at the 1990 Asian Games
Asian Games medalists in football
Asian Games silver medalists for North Korea
Asian Games competitors for North Korea
20th-century North Korean people